A list of films produced in Hong Kong in 1979.

1979

References

External links

 IMDB list of Hong Kong films
 Hong Kong films of 1979 at HKcinemamagic.com

1979
Hong Kong
Films